Robert R. Wachs (January 26, 1923 – November 28, 1993) was an American football and basketball coach. He served as the head men's basketball coach at Northern State University in Aberdeen, South Dakota from 1955 to 1985, compiling a record of 532–286. Wachs was also the head football coach at Northern State in 1956, tallying a mark of 6–3.

Head coaching record

Football

References

External links
 

1923 births
1993 deaths
Basketball coaches from Minnesota
Northern Colorado Bears football players
Northern State Wolves football coaches
Northern State Wolves men's basketball coaches
High school football coaches in Nebraska
People from Tracy, Minnesota
Players of American football from Minnesota
High school basketball coaches in Nebraska
High school football coaches in Kansas
High school basketball coaches in Kansas